Ratwal is a village of Attock District in the Punjab province of Pakistan. It is located at 33.4944° N, 72.7201° E on an altitude of 531 metres.

References 

Villages in Attock District